Jim Hall may refer to:

Sports
 Jim Hall (baseball) (died 1886), professional baseball player from 1872 to 1875
 Jim Hall (boxer) (1868–1913), Australian boxer in the late 19th century
 Jim Hall (footballer, born 1914) (1914–?), English footballer who played for Blackpool
 Jim Hall (footballer, born 1945), English footballer who made 450 Football League appearances
 Jim Hall (Australian footballer) (1919–2006), Australian rules footballer for St Kilda
 Jim Hall (announcer) (1933-2017), for the New York Giants
 Jim Hall (racing driver) (born 1935), founder of Chaparral Cars

Other
 Jim Hall (civil engineer), British professor of civil and environmental engineering 
 Jim Hall (musician) (1930–2013), American jazz guitarist
 Jim Hall (computer programmer), began the FreeDOS project
 Jim Hall (body artist), Baltimore native known for his whole-body tattoo

See also
 James Hall (disambiguation)